Jasmin Duehring (née Glaesser; born July 8, 1992) is a German-born Canadian cyclist, who currently rides for American amateur team . Duehring was part of the Canadian team that won bronze medals at the 2012 Summer Olympics and the 2016 Summer Olympics in the women's team pursuit. She was also part of the team that won gold at the 2011 Pan American Games in the team pursuit.

Career
Duehring took up cycling in 2009 when seeking a lower-impact sport after suffering hip injuries as a runner whilst at Terry Fox Secondary School. Glaesser also participated in ballet and figure skating whilst growing up.

Her first competition for Canada was at the 2011 Pan American Games where she won gold for her new nation. Duehring then appeared for Canada at the 2012 UCI Track Cycling World Championships, there she won a silver in the points race before adding a bronze as a member of the team pursuit. She built onto this the next season, where she finished in preparation for the Olympics second in the team pursuit at the Track Cycling World Cup in London in February 2012 and won bronze as a part of the Canada's women's team pursuit at the 2012 Olympics together with Tara Whitten and Gillian Carleton. After winning the bronze Duehring said "We were so ready to just go out there and do our best. Team Canada, in coming here, has a saying, ‘Give Your Everything, and that was kind of our motto — leave everything out there."

In 2016, she was officially named in Canada's 2016 Olympic team, and again won a bronze medal.

She has qualified to represent Canada at the 2020 Summer Olympics.

Personal
Duehring was born in Paderborn, Germany and currently resides in Vancouver, British Columbia. She moved to Canada at the age of eight when her father took a position at Simon Fraser University teaching computer science. She received her Canadian citizenship shortly before the 2012 Olympics.

Major results

Track

2011
 1st  Team pursuit, Pan American Games
2012
 UCI Track World Championships
2nd  Points race
3rd  Team pursuit
 2nd Team pursuit, 2011–12 UCI Track Cycling World Cup, London
 3rd  Team pursuit, Olympic Games
2013
 1st  Team pursuit, 2012–13 UCI Track Cycling World Cup, Aguascalientes
 1st Team pursuit, Los Angeles Grand Prix (with Allison Beveridge, Laura Brown, Gillian Carleton and Stephanie Roorda)
 2013–14 UCI Track Cycling World Cup
2nd  Team pursuit, Manchester
2nd  Points race, Aguascalientes
2nd  Team pursuit, Aguascalientes
 3rd  Team pursuit, UCI Track World Championships
2014
 1st  Team pursuit, 2013–14 UCI Track Cycling World Cup, Guadalajara
 Pan American Track Championships
1st  Points race
1st  Individual pursuit
 UCI Track World Championships
2nd  Team pursuit
3rd  Points race
 2014–15 UCI Track Cycling World Cup
2nd  Team pursuit, Guadalajara
2nd  Points race, London
3rd  Team pursuit, London
 2nd Omnium, Los Angeles Grand Prix
2015
 Pan American Games
1st  Team pursuit (with Allison Beveridge, Laura Brown and Kirsti Lay)
2nd  Omnium
 Team pursuit, 2015–16 UCI Track Cycling World Cup
1st  Cali
2nd  Cambridge
 Milton International Challenge
1st Omnium
1st Team pursuit (with Allison Beveridge, Laura Brown and Kirsti Lay)
 3rd  Team pursuit, UCI Track World Championships
2016
 Pan American Track Championships
1st  Points race
1st  Team pursuit (with Ariane Bonhomme, Kinley Gibson and Jamie Gilgen)
3rd  Individual pursuit
 2015–16 UCI Track Cycling World Cup, Hong Kong
1st  Team pursuit
2nd  Points race
 UCI Track World Championships
2nd  Points race
2nd  Team pursuit (with Allison Beveridge, Kirsti Lay and Georgia Simmerling)
 3rd  Team pursuit, Olympic Games (with Allison Beveridge, Kirsti Lay and Georgia Simmerling)
2017
 2016–17 UCI Track Cycling World Cup, Los Angeles
2nd  Scratch
3rd  Team pursuit
 2nd  Points race, 2017–18 UCI Track Cycling World Cup, Milton
 7th Overall Six Days of London
1st Scratch
2018
 3rd  Points race, UCI Track World Championships
2019
 Team pursuit, 2019–20 UCI Track Cycling World Cup
3rd  Cambridge
3rd  Brisbane

Road

2013
 3rd Time trial, National Road Championships
2014
 2nd Time trial, National Road Championships
 3rd Chrono Gatineau
 3rd Grand Prix cycliste de Gatineau
 10th Time trial, Commonwealth Games
2015
 Pan American Games
1st  Road race
2nd  Time trial
 2nd Time trial, National Road Championships
 4th Overall Tour of the Gila
1st  Young rider classification
 6th Overall San Dimas Stage Race
1st  Young rider classification
 10th Chrono Gatineau
2016
 3rd Overall Tour of the Gila
1st Young rider classification
1st Stage 2
2017
 3rd Overall Cascade Cycling Classic
 7th Chrono Gatineau
2018
 1st Overall San Dimas Stage Race
1st Stages 1 (ITT) & 2
 3rd Chrono Kristin Armstrong
 5th Overall Redlands Bicycle Classic
1st Stage 3
 6th Overall Tour of the Gila
 9th Winston-Salem Cycling Classic
2019
 3rd Overall Tour of the Gila
 6th Chrono Kristin Armstrong
 9th Overall Joe Martin Stage Race

References

External links

1992 births
Living people
Canadian female cyclists
German track cyclists
Cyclists at the 2012 Summer Olympics
Cyclists at the 2016 Summer Olympics
Cyclists at the 2020 Summer Olympics
Olympic cyclists of Canada
People from Coquitlam
Sportspeople from Paderborn
Olympic medalists in cycling
Olympic bronze medalists for Canada
Medalists at the 2012 Summer Olympics
Naturalized citizens of Canada
Cyclists from North Rhine-Westphalia
German emigrants to Canada
Sportspeople from British Columbia
Cyclists at the 2014 Commonwealth Games
Commonwealth Games competitors for Canada
German female cyclists
Pan American Games gold medalists for Canada
Cyclists at the 2015 Pan American Games
Pan American Games silver medalists for Canada
Medalists at the 2016 Summer Olympics
Pan American Games medalists in cycling
Medalists at the 2011 Pan American Games
Medalists at the 2015 Pan American Games